Wang Chu (born 10 January 1991) is a Chinese professional footballer who plays as a midfielder for Sichuan Jiuniu in the China League One.

Club career
Wang Chu started his football career when he joined Metz's youth academy in 2004 as a part of a cooperation between Metz and the Chengdu Football Association. He was promoted to Metz reserve to play in Championnat de France Amateur in 2010. In June 2012, he terminated his contract with Metz after the club refused to promote him to the first team.

Wang signed a two-year contract with Luxembourg National Division side Jeunesse Esch in the summer of 2012. He won Luxembourg Cup with the club in the 2012–13 season. On 4 July 2013, he scored a goal in the first leg of the first qualifying round of 2013–14 UEFA Europa League in a 2–0 home victory against Finnish club TPS. He scored again in the second leg on 9 July 2013, which ensured Jeunesse Esch win 3–2 on aggregate and advance to the next round. He didn't extend his contract at the end of the 2013–14 season due to serious injury.

On 17 June 2016, Wang signed a one-year contract with Cova da Piedade which newly earned promotion to LigaPro. He made his debut in Portugal on 20 August 2016 in 1–0 away victory against Braga B, coming on as a substitute for Robson in the 84th minute. On 18 July 2017, he extended his contract with the club for another season.

Wang was loaned to Chinese Super League newcomer Beijing Renhe on 25 February 2018. In February 2019,Wang Chu joined China League Two side Sichuan Jiuniu.

Career statistics
.

Honours

Club
Jeunesse Esch
Luxembourg Cup: 2012-13

References

External links
 

1991 births
Living people
Chinese footballers
Footballers from Sichuan
Sportspeople from Chengdu
Association football midfielders
Liga Portugal 2 players
Jeunesse Esch players
FC Metz players
C.D. Cova da Piedade players
Beijing Renhe F.C. players
Sichuan Jiuniu F.C. players
China League Two players
China League One players
Chinese Super League players
Chinese expatriate footballers
Chinese expatriate sportspeople in France
Expatriate footballers in France
Expatriate footballers in Luxembourg
Chinese expatriate sportspeople in Portugal
Expatriate footballers in Portugal